The 2018–19 Mid-American Conference men's basketball season began with practices in October 2018, followed by the start of the 2018–19 NCAA Division I men's basketball season in November. Conference play began in January 2019 and concluded in March 2019. The season marked the 76th season of Mid–American Conference basketball.

Preseason 
In the preseason, Buffalo, which returned five of its six leading scorers from a team that defeated Arizona Wildcats men's basketball in the NCAA tournament, was discussed as a team that could potentially make a "Cinderalla run" in the NCAA Tournament.

The preseason poll and league awards were announced by the league office on October 30, 2019.

Coaching changes

Preseason men's basketball poll
(First place votes in parenthesis)

East Division
 Buffalo 210 (35)
 Miami 127
 Kent State 122 
 Ohio 121 
 Akron 97 
 Bowling Green 58

West Division
 Eastern Michigan 183  (17)
 Ball State 175 (11)
 Toledo 156 (5)
 Western Michigan 81 (1)
 Northern Illinois 73 
 Central Michigan 67 (1)

Tournament Champs
Buffalo (25), Eastern Michigan (3), Toledo (3), Central Michigan (1), Miami (1), Northern Illinois (1), Western Michigan (1)

Honors

Watchlists

Regular season

Conference matrix 
This table summarizes the head-to-head results between teams in conference play.

Season summary & highlights

Points scored

Conference regular season

Midseason watchlists

Postseason

Mid–American Tournament

Highlights

NCAA Tournament

National Invitation Tournament

Awards and honors

Honors

See also
2018–19 Mid-American Conference women's basketball season

References